Iván Ayón-Rivas (born 17 February 1993) is a Peruvian operatic tenor. A former student of the Conservatorio Nacional de Música in Lima, he perfectioned his artistry in Italy under the guidance of Roberto Servile. He achieved widespread notoriety in October 2021, as the winner of first prize at Plácido Domingo's international opera competition Operalia 2021.

References

Living people
1993 births
People from Piura
Peruvian operatic tenors
Operalia, The World Opera Competition prize-winners